An online video platform (OVP), provided by a video hosting service, enables users to upload, convert, store and play back video content on the Internet, often via a private server structured, large-scale system that may generate revenue. Users will generally upload video content via the hosting service's wesite, mobile or desktop application, or other interfaces (API). An example of an OVP is YouTube. The type of video content uploaded might be anything from shorts to full-length TV shows and movies. The video host stores the video on its server and offers users the ability to enable different types of embed codes or links that allow others to view the video content. The website, mainly used as the video hosting website, is usually called the video-sharing website.

Description
Online video platforms can use a software as a service (SaaS) business model, a do it yourself (DIY) model or user-generated content (UGC) model. The OVP comes with an end-to-end tool set to upload, encode, manage, playback, style, deliver, distribute, download, publish and measure quality of service or audience engagement quality of experience of online video content for both video on demand and live delivery. This is usually manifested as a User Interface with log-in credentials. OVPs also include providing a custom video player or a third-party video player that can be embedded in a website. Modern online video platforms are often coupled up with embedded online video analytics providing video publishers with detailed insights into video performance: the total number of video views, impressions, and unique views; video watch time, stats on user location, visits, and behavior on the site. Video heat maps show how user engagement rate changes through the viewing process in order to measure audience interaction and to create compelling video content. OVPs are related to the over-the-top content video industry, although there are many OVP providers that are also present in broadcast markets, serving video on demand set-top boxes.

OVP product models vary in scale and feature-set, ranging from ready-made web sites that individuals can use, to white label models that can be customized by enterprise clients or media/content aggregators and integrated with their traditional broadcast workflows. The former example is YouTube. The latter example is predominantly found in FTA (Free-To-Air) or pay-TV broadcasters who seek to provide an over-the-top media service (OTT) that extends the availability of their content on desktops or multiple mobility devices.

In general, the graphical user interface accessed by users of the OVP is sold as a service. Revenue is derived from monthly subscriptions based on the number of users it is licensed to and the complexity of the workflow. Some workflows require encryption of content with DRM and this increases the cost of using the service. Videos may be transcoded from their original source format or resolution to a mezzanine format (suitable for management and mass-delivery), either on-site or using cloud computing. The latter would be where platform as a service, is provided as an additional cost.

It is feasible, but rare, for large broadcasters to develop their own proprietary OVP. However, this can require complex development and maintenance costs and diverts attention to 'building' as opposed to distributing/curating content.

OVPs often cooperate with specialized third-party service providers, using what they call an application programming interface (API). These include cloud transcoders, recommendation engines, search engines, metadata libraries and analytics providers.

Video and content delivery protocols
The vast majority of OVPs use industry-standard HTTP streaming or HTTP progressive download protocols. With HTTP streaming, the de facto standard is to use adaptive streaming where multiple files of a video are created at different bit rates, but only one of these is sent to the end-user during playback, depending on available bandwidth or device CPU constraints. This can be switched dynamically and near-seamlessly at any time during the video viewing. The main protocols for adaptive HTTP streaming include Smooth Streaming (by Microsoft), HTTP Live Streaming (HLS) (by Apple) and Flash Video (by Adobe). Flash is still in use but is declining due to the popularity of HLS and Smooth Stream in mobile devices and desktops, respectively. Each is a proprietary protocol in its own right and due to this fragmentation, there have been efforts to create one standardized protocol known as MPEG-DASH.

There are many OVPs available on the Internet.

Influence
In the 2010s, with the increasing prevalence of technology and the Internet in everyday life, video hosting services serve as a portal to different forms of entertainment (comedy, shows, games, or music), news, documentaries and educational videos. Content may be either both user-generated, amateur clips or commercial products. The entertainment industry uses this medium to release music and videos, movies and television shows directly to the public. Since many users do not have unlimited web space, either as a paid service, or through an ISP offering, video hosting services are becoming increasingly popular, especially with the explosion in popularity of blogs, internet forums and other interactive pages. The mass market for camera phones and smartphones has increased the supply of user-generated video. Traditional methods of personal video distribution, such as making a DVD to show to friends at home, are unsuited to the low resolution and high volume of camera phone clips. In contrast, current broadband Internet connections are well suited to serving the quality of video shot on mobile phones. Most people do not own web servers, and this has created demand for user-generated video content hosting.

Free video format support
Some websites prefer royalty-free video formats such as Theora (with Ogg) and VP8 (with WebM). In particular, the Wikipedia community advocates the Ogg format, and some websites now support searching specifically for WebM videos.

Copyright issues
On some websites, users share entire films by breaking them up into segments that are about the size of the video length limit imposed by the site (e.g., 15-minutes). An emerging practice is for users to obfuscate the titles of feature-length films that they share by providing a title that is recognizable by humans but will not match on standard search engines. It is not even in all cases obvious to the user if a provided video is a copyright infringement.

For privacy reasons, the users' comments are usually ignored by websites of the Internet preservation, as it happens in Web Archive, or in Archive.today copy saving.

Mobile video hosting

A more recent application of the video hosting services is in the mobile web 2.0 arena, where video and other mobile content can be delivered to, and easily accessed by mobile devices. While some video-hosting services like DaCast and Ustream have developed means by which video can be watched on mobile devices, mobile-oriented web-based frontends for video hosting services that possess equal access and capability to desktop-oriented web services have yet to be developed. A mobile live streaming software called Qik allows the users to upload videos from their cell phones to the internet. The videos will then be stored online and can be shared to various social networking sites like Twitter, Facebook and YouTube. Videos will be stored on the servers and can be watched from both the mobile devices and the website.

History
Practical online video hosting and video streaming was made possible by advances in video compression, due to the impractically high bandwidth requirements of uncompressed video. Raw uncompressed digital video has a bit rate of 168Mbit/s for SD video, and over 1Gbit/s for full HD video. The most important data compression algorithm that enabled practical video hosting and streaming is the discrete cosine transform (DCT), a lossy compression technique first proposed by Nasir Ahmed, T. Natarajan and K. R. Rao in 1973. The DCT algorithm is the basis for the first practical video coding format, H.261, in 1988. It was followed by more popular DCT-based video coding formats, most notably the MPEG and H.26x video standards from 1991 onwards. The modified discrete cosine transform (MDCT) is also the basis for the MP3 audio compression format introduced in 1994, and later the Advanced Audio Coding (AAC) format in 1999.

Video hosting sites
The first Internet video hosting site was ShareYourWorld.com. Founded in 1997, it allowed users to upload clips or full videos in different file formats. However, Internet access bandwidth and video transcoding technology at the time were limited, so the site did not support video streaming like YouTube later did. ShareYourWorld was founded by Chase Norlin, and it ran until 2001, when it closed due to budget and bandwidth problems.

Founded in October 2004, Pandora TV from South Korea is the first video sharing website in the world to attach advertisements to user-submitted video clips and to provide unlimited storage space for users to upload their own clips. The company has developed an auto-advertisements system that automatically inserts advertising to the clips posted to the website. It was founded in the Gangnam District of Seoul.

Video streaming platforms
YouTube was founded by Chad Hurley, Jawed Karim and Steve Chen in 2005. It was based on video transcoding technology, which enabled the video streaming of user-generated content from anywhere on the World Wide Web. This was made possible by implementing a Flash player based on MPEG-4 AVC video with AAC audio. This allowed any video coding format to be uploaded, and then transcoded into Flash-compatible AVC video that can be directly streamed from anywhere on the Web. The first YouTube video clip was Me at the zoo, uploaded by Karim in April 2005.

YouTube subsequently became the most popular online video platform, and changed the way videos were hosted on the Web. The success of YouTube led to a number of similar online video streaming platforms, from companies such as Netflix, Hulu and Crunchyroll.

Within these video streaming platforms like Netflix, Hulu, and YouTube, there are privacy concerns about how the websites use consumers' personal information and online behaviors to advertise and track spending. Many video streaming websites record semi-private consumer information such as video streaming data, purchase frequency, genre of videos watched, etc.

See also

Comparison of video hosting services
Flash Video ("Flash")
Fliggo
List of online video platforms
Online video analytics
Streaming media

References

 
Internet hosting